Chris Kroeze (born January 28, 1991) is an American singer. He is the runner-up of season 15 of the American talent competition The Voice at the age of 27.

Early life
Chris was born and raised in Barron, Wisconsin. He learned to play the guitar when he was six after his parents bought him a guitar. He started singing in middle school when he was 13 years old and started performing in local bars while in high school as part of a local band. He studied audio production and engineering at a college in Minneapolis.  He then went to pursue a music career in Nashville, where he recorded a song at the studio of Dierks Bentley. He later returned to Wisconsin. He has performed regularly in the Middle East for the troops.

Career

In 2018, Chris Kroeze entered the 15th season of The Voice. In his blind audition he sang "Pride and Joy" by Stevie Ray Vaughan. Jennifer Hudson and Blake Shelton turned, and he chose to be a part of Team Blake. In his battle, he was paired with folk rock singer Mercedes Ferreira-Dias where they sang Waylon Jennings and Steve Windwood's "Back in the high life again" and Shelton advanced Kroeze. In the knockout rounds, he was paired with blues rock singer Michael Lee, and though Lee was declared the winner, Shelton used his "save" to advance Kroeze as well. He made it to the finale and placed second in the competition on December 18, 2018.

The Voice (2018)

The Voice performances

Personal life
Kroeze is married to Mara, and they have two children.

Discography

Albums

Singles

References

The Voice (franchise) contestants
Universal Music Group artists
1991 births
Living people
21st-century American singers
Singers from Wisconsin